Billig is a surname. Notable people with the surname include:

Andy Billig (born 1968), American politician
Etel Billig (1932–2012), American actress and director
Frederick S. Billig (1933–2006), American aerospace engineer
Fritz Billig (1902–1986), Austrian philatelist
Hannah Billig (1901–1987), British physician
Janet Billig Rich (born 1967), American talent manager and producer
Michael Billig (born 1947), British academic
Simon Billig, British actor